An immigration minister is a member of a government cabinet who usually heads and leads a ministry which manages issues of immigration, asylum for refugees, and the granting of citizenship.

List of ministers by country

Other:
 Minister of Labour and Immigration (Manitoba)
 Ministry of Citizenship and Immigration (Ontario)

 
Immigration